Caecilia perdita is a species of caecilian in the family Caeciliidae. It is endemic to Colombia. Its natural habitats are subtropical or tropical moist lowland forests, plantations, rural gardens, and heavily degraded former forest.

References

perdita
Amphibians of Colombia
Endemic fauna of Colombia
Amphibians described in 1968
Taxonomy articles created by Polbot